Karjjana is a village in Bhatar CD block in Bardhaman Sadar North subdivision of Purba Bardhaman district in the state of West Bengal, India with total 990 families residing.

History
Census 2011 Karjjana Village Location Code or Village Code 319812. The village of Karjjana is located in the Bhatar tehsil of Burdwan district in West Bengal, India.

Transport 

Population 
Karjjana village, most of the village population is from Schedule Tribe (ST). Schedule Tribe (ST) constitutes 36.04% while Schedule Caste (SC) were 22.25% of total population in Karjjana village.

Population and house data

Healthcare
Nearest Rural Hospital at Bhatar (with 60 beds) is the main medical facility in Bhatar CD block. There are primary health centers.

References 

Villages in Purba Bardhaman district